Zouyu, also called zouwu or zouya, is a legendary creature mentioned in old Chinese literature. The earliest known appearance of the characters  (zou yu) is in the Book of Songs, but J.J.L. Duyvendak describes that the interpretation of that little poem as referring to an animal of that name is "very doubtful".

Zouyu appears in a number of later works, where it is described as  "righteous" animal, which, similarly to a qilin, only appears during the rule of a benevolent and sincere monarch. It is said to be as fierce-looking as a tiger, but gentle and strictly vegetarian, and described in some books (already in Shuowen Jiezi) as a white tiger with black spots.

During the reign of the Yongle Emperor (early 15th century), his relative from Kaifeng sent him a captured zouyu, and another zouyu was sighted in Shandong. The zouyu sightings were mentioned by contemporaneous authors as good omens, along with the Yellow River running clear and the delivery of  a qilin (i.e., an African giraffe) by a Bengal delegation that arrived to China aboard Zheng He's fleet.

Puzzled about the real zoological identity of the zouyu said to be captured during the Yongle era,  Duyvendak exclaims, "Can it possibly have been a Pandah?" Following him, some modern authors consider zouyu to refer to the giant panda.

Sinologist and linguist Wolfgang Behr included the zouyu ~ zouwu ~ zouya among several leophoric names, besides  shī-zǐ and  suān-ní, in ancient Chinese texts to denote lions.

Popular culture

The creature appears in the 2018 fantasy film Fantastic Beasts: The Crimes of Grindelwald as an elephant-sized cat resembling a lion/tiger mix with large eyes, four upper tusks, and a ruffled tail (resembling those of Chinese guardian lions and those from Shang-Chi and the Legend of the Ten Rings three years later on) and has the ability to apparate.

Notes

Further reading
Behr, Wolfgang. "Hinc sunt leones – two ancient Eurasian migratory terms in Chinese revisited (I-II)". International Journal of Central Asian Studies.  Volume 9, 2004, pp. 1-25; Volume 10, 2005, pp. 1-22.

Chinese legendary creatures
Mythological felines
Classic of Mountains and Seas